The Rockford Metropolitan Statistical Area, as defined by the United States Census Bureau, is an area consisting of four counties in north-central Illinois, anchored by the city of Rockford. As of the 2010 census, the MSA had a population of 349,431 (though a 2011 estimate placed the population at 348,360).  The Rockford MSA abuts the southern portions of the Janesville-Beloit MSA and the Chicago MSA.  It forms the main part of the larger Rockford–Freeport–Rochelle Combined Statistical Area (est. pop. 455,595).

Counties
Boone
Ogle
Stephenson
Winnebago

Communities
Places with more than 150,000 inhabitants
Rockford (Principal City)
Places with 20,000 to 30,000 inhabitants
Belvidere
Freeport
Loves Park
Machesney Park
Places with 5,000 to 20,000 inhabitants
Rochelle
Rockton
Roscoe
South Beloit
Places with 1,000 to 5,000 inhabitants
Byron
Cherry Valley
Davis Junction
Durand
Lake Summerset (census-designated place; partial)
Mount Morris
Oregon
Pecatonica
Polo
Poplar Grove
Stillman Valley
Winnebago
Places with less than 1,000 inhabitants
Caledonia
Capron
New Milford
Timberlane
Unincorporated places
Argyle
Harrison
Seward
Shirland

Townships

Belvidere
Bonus
Boone
Burritt
Caledonia
Cherry Valley
Durand
Flora
Harlem
Harrison
Laona
Leroy

Manchester
Owen
Pecatonica
Poplar Grove
Rockford
Rockton
Roscoe
Seward
Shirland
Spring
Winnebago

Demographics

As of the census of 2000, there were 320,204 people, 122,577 households, and 84,896 families residing within the MSA. The racial makeup of the MSA was 83.46% White, 9.27% African American, 0.29% Native American, 1.56% Asian, 0.03% Pacific Islander, 3.57% from other races, and 1.82% from two or more races. Hispanic or Latino of any race were 7.63% of the population.

The median income for a household in the MSA was $48,142, and the median income for a family was $55,881. Males had a median income of $41,141 versus $25,819 for females. The per capita income for the MSA was $21,392.

Combined Statistical Area
The Rockford–Freeport–Rochelle Combined Statistical Area is made up of four counties in north-central Illinois. The statistical area includes one metropolitan area and two micropolitan areas. As of the 2000 Census, the CSA had a population of 420,215 (though a July 1, 2009 estimate placed the population at 455,595).

Metropolitan Statistical Areas (MSAs)
Rockford (Winnebago and Boone counties)
Micropolitan Statistical Areas (μSAs)
Freeport (Stephenson County)
Rochelle (Ogle County)

See also
Illinois census statistical areas

References

 
Metropolitan areas of Illinois